Criorhina ranunculi, is a species of hoverfly found in the spring in many parts of Britain and Europe.

The larvae of C. ranunculi are associated with rotting deciduous wood. Adults are remarkable bumblebee mimics and are usually found in woodland in springtime visiting flowers such as sallow to feed.

Description
For terms see Morphology of Diptera
Large (wing length 11·25–14 mm.) bumblebee mimic. Thorax and abdomen with long, dense hairs. Hairs black on thorax and basal part of abdomen red or yellowish on tip of abdomen. Scutellar hairs may be pale yellow or brownish. Hind femora considerably thickened, especially in males. Hind tibiae sickle-shaped.

Distribution
It has a Palaearctic distribution, including southern Norway and Sweden south to central Spain, and from Ireland eastwards through central Europe into European parts of Russia.

Biology
Habitat includes: Betula, Fagus, and Quercus forest.
Adults are primarily arboreal, but descend to visit flowering shrubs in sun-lit glades. These flies are extremely fast, with a highpitched whine, zig-zagging between the branches of flowering trees. Flowers visited include Cardamine pratensis, Cornus sanguinea, Crataegus, Photinia, Prunus cerasus, Prunus spinosa, Rubus, Salix, and Sorbus aucuparia. The flight period is from the beginning of March to mid May (later at higher altitudes).

See also
Other bumblebee mimics are Mallota, Arctophila, Merodon, Pocota and Brachypalpus. Criorhina differ from these genera in the form of the antennae.

Notes

References

REDIRECT Criorhina ranunculi

External links
Images at boldsystems.org

Diptera of Europe
Eristalinae
Insects described in 1803
Taxa named by Georg Wolfgang Franz Panzer